is a Japanese actress. Her father is Kansai Yamamoto.

Personal life
Yamamoto was born in Tokyo, Japan. She met Kippei Shiina in 1995 when they worked together on the series , and began dating him after they co-starred in the 1998 film Fuyajo. The couple married in 2003, and divorced amicably in October 2019.

Filmography

Film
 Mikeneko Holmes no Suiri (1996)
Fuyajo (1998)
Who Am I? (1998)
 39 Keiho dai Sanjukyu jô (1999)
 Mr. Rookie (2002)
 Kagami no Onnatachi (2002)
 Hotaru no Hoshi (2003)
 Jigoku Kozo (2004)
 Exte (2007)
 Villon's Wife (2009)
 Our Story (2020)
 My Happy Marriage (2023), Yurie

Television
 2001 no otoko un (Fuji TV, 2001)
 Kaidan Hyaku Monogatari (Fuji TV, 2002)
 Taiho Shichauzo (TV Asahi, 2002, ep2)
 Aibou (TV Asahi, 2002)
 Sky High (TV Asahi, 2003, ep6)
 Tsubasa no Oreta Tenshitachi (Fuji TV, 2006)
 Taiyo no Uta (TBS, 2006)
 Akai Ito (Fuji TV, 2008)
 Otomen (2009 TV series) as Asuka's mother
 Tsubasa (NHK, 2009)
 Hanazakari no Kimitachi (Fuji TV, 2011) as Io Nanba
 Ultraman Ginga S (TV Tokyo, 2014) as Queen Kisara

References

External links
Official profile at Teatro de Poche 

1974 births
Living people
Actresses from Tokyo
Japanese film actresses
Japanese television actresses
20th-century Japanese actresses
21st-century Japanese actresses